#2 is the second solo record from German singer-songwriter Thees Uhlmann released on Uhlmann's own Grand Hotel van Cleef Records. The album was produced by Tobian Kuhn. Of the album's production, Uhlmann stated that he often would write the first lyrics of a song and wait for Kuhn's reaction. Once satisfied, they would continue the rest of the piece. The album was a critical and commercial success in Uhlmann's native Germany, reaching #2 on the German Albums Chart.

Track listing

Charts

References

2013 albums
Thees Uhlmann albums